Little Orvie is a 1940 American comedy-drama film directed by Ray McCarey and written by Lynn Root, Frank Fenton and Robert Chapin. The film stars Johnny Sheffield, Ernest Truex, Dorothy Tree, Ann E. Todd and Emma Dunn. The film was released on March 1, 1940, by RKO Pictures.

Plot
Youngster Orvie really wants a dog, however he is told by his parents that he cannot have a dog. However he finds a stray dog and decides to keep him for a day.

Cast 
 Johnny Sheffield as Orvie 'Orvie' Stone
 Ernest Truex as Frank Stone
 Dorothy Tree as Clara Stone
 Ann E. Todd as Patsy Balliser 
 Emma Dunn as Mrs. Welty
 Daisy Lee Mothershed as Corbina
 Fay Helm as Mrs. Balliser
 Virginia Brissac as Mrs. Green
 Paul E. Burns as Angelo
 Dell Henderson as Mr. Brown
 Fern Emmett as Mrs. Jackson
 Edgar Dearing as Policeman
 Ray Turner as Jefferson

References

External links 
 
 
 
 

1940 films
American black-and-white films
RKO Pictures films
Films directed by Ray McCarey
Films based on works by Booth Tarkington
American comedy-drama films
1940 comedy-drama films
Films scored by Paul Sawtell
1940s English-language films
1940s American films